The Zhejiang Circuit is a motorsport circuit in Shaoxing, China. It was designed by Apex Circuit Design Ltd and opened in 2016.

Lap records
The official race lap records at the Zhejiang International Circuit are listed as:

Notes

References

External links
Zhejiang Circuit official website
Zhejiang - RacingCircuits.info
Apex Circuit Design Ltd

Motorsport venues in Zhejiang
Sports venues completed in 2016